Biencourt is a municipality in the Canadian province of Quebec, and located in the Témiscouata Regional County Municipality. The municipality had a population of 464 in the Canada 2016 Census.

See also
Touladi River
List of municipalities in Quebec

References

External links

Municipalities in Quebec
Incorporated places in Bas-Saint-Laurent